Rajiv Chintaman Yeravdekar is an Indian Educationist, & is better known as the Dean and Faculty of Health & Biomedical Sciences of Symbiosis International University. He is on the Board of Governors of the Medical Council of India and is dean of Pune-based Symbiosis Institute of Health Sciences (SIHS)

Rajiv, is an alumnus of the B. J. Medical College, Pune

See also 
 University of Pune

References

External links 
 
 

Year of birth missing (living people)
Indian medical writers
Living people
20th-century Indian medical doctors